"Lightnin' Strikes" is a song written by Lou Christie and Twyla Herbert, and recorded by Christie on the MGM label. It was a hit in 1966, making it first to No. 1 in Canada in January 1966 on the RPM Top Singles chart, then to No. 1 in the U.S. on the Billboard Hot 100 in February, No. 3 on the New Zealand Listener chart in May, and No. 11 on the UK Record Retailer chart. RIAA certification on March 3, 1966, garnering gold status for selling over one million copies.

Personnel

The song was arranged, conducted, and produced by Charles Calello and was recorded on September 3, 1965.  The song featured backing vocals from Bernadette Carroll, Peggy Santiglia and Denise Ferri of The Delicates.  Session personnel included Joe Farrell and George Young on baritone sax; Ray DeSio on trombone; Stan Free on piano; Lou Mauro on bass; Charlie Macy, Ralph Casale, and Vinnie Bell on guitar; and Buddy Saltzman on drums.  Ralph Casale's "stuttering" guitar solo was an overdub.

Chart performance

Weekly charts

Year-end charts

References

1965 songs
1965 singles
1966 singles
Songs written by Twyla Herbert
Songs written by Lou Christie
Lou Christie songs
Jan and Dean songs
Billboard Hot 100 number-one singles
Cashbox number-one singles
RPM Top Singles number-one singles
MGM Records singles